Alarnatha Temple or Alvarnaatha (Sanskrit:अल्वार् नाथ),(Oriya:ଅଲାରନାଥ) is a Hindu temple dedicated to Vishnu and located in Brahmagiri, Odisha, near Puri. It becomes crowded during the krishnapaksha of Ashadha, after the Snana Yatra when devotees are not allowed to see the central icon of Jagannath (a form of Vishnu) in his Puri temple. During this period, popularly known as Anasara or 'Anavasara' (literally meaning no opportunity to see the lord of Puri), instead of having darshan in the Puri temple, devotees believe that Jagannath during this time manifests as Alarnath Dev, at the Alarnath temple in Brahmagiri, which is about 23 km from Puri.

Historical evidence
The temple is associated with the visit of the saint Ramanujacharya to Odisha. Chaitanya Mahaprabhu during his stay in Puri used to see the icon of Jagannath daily. During Anavasara when Jagannath and his sibling deities were taken to the secret chamber for 15 days, he was unable to see the god. So as per legend, the god directed him to go to Brahmagiri and visit the Alarnath temple. Still today the Shila over which Chaitanya used to do Samkeertan is there. Many historians opine that Alwars once visited this place, but there is no mention of it in Divyaprabandam.

Temple timings
The temple opens at 6 AM and closes at 9:30PM. Baal Bhoga (breakfast) is offered in the morning. At midday, different kinds of rice, daal, and vegetable curries are offered along with kheeri (rice pudding) as dessert. At night, different kinds of pitha and khichudi with plantain fry is offered. During Anavasara time the Kheeri bhoga offered to Alvarnaath Swami is much hyped and in demand.

References

info about temple
history of the lord of Alvars

Vishnu temples
Hindu temples in Puri district